The Pace Setters are the athletic teams that represent Pace University, located in New York City, New York, in NCAA Division II intercollegiate sports.

The Setters are full members of the Northeast-10 Conference, which is home to all sixteen of its athletic programs. Pace has been a member of the Northeast-10 since 1997.

Varsity teams

List of teams

Men's sports (7)
 Baseball
 Basketball
 Cross Country
 Esports
 Football
 Lacrosse
 Swimming and diving

Women's sports (9)
 Basketball
 Cross country
 Esports
 Field hockey
 Lacrosse
 Soccer
 Softball
 Swimming and diving
 Volleyball

Facilities
Pace's athletic facilities are highlighted by the  Goldstein Health, Fitness and Recreation Center in Pleasantville, New York, which boasts a 2,400-seat arena, eight-lane swimming pool, weight/fitness room, aerobics/dance room, training room, locker rooms, equipment room, meeting rooms, and offices of the athletics department.

References

External links
 

Pace University
College sports teams in New York (state)
NCAA Division II teams